The Greater Bunbury sub-region includes the local government areas of City of Bunbury, Shire of Harvey, Shire of Dardanup and Shire of Capel, and comprises the following localities (suburbs):

Australind
Beela
Benger
Binningup
Boyanup
Brunswick Junction
Bunbury
Burekup
Capel
Capel River
Carey Park
College Grove
Cookernup
Crooked Brook
Dalyellup
Dardanup
Dardanup West
Davenport
East Bunbury
Eaton
Elgin
Ferguson
Forrest Beach
Gelorup
Glen Iris
Gwindinup
Harvey
Henty
Hoffman
Kemerton
Leschenault
Ludlow (northern half)
Millbridge
Mornington
Myalup
North Boyanup
Paradise
Parkfield
Pelican Point
Peppermint Grove Beach
Picton
Picton East
Riverlea
Roelands
South Bunbury
Stirling Estate
Stratham
The Plains
Uduc
Usher
Vittoria
Warawarrup
Waterloo
Wellesley
Wellington Forest
Wellington Mill
Withers
Wokalup
Yarloop

Bunbury
 
Bunbury suburbs